"Half the Man" is a song by British funk/acid jazz band Jamiroquai, released in November 1994 as a single from their second studio album, The Return of the Space Cowboy (1994). The single peaked at number 15 on the UK Singles Chart. "Half the Man" is in the key of D major.

Background
The track was later featured on the soundtrack of cult British surf movie Blue Juice. With the exception of its inclusion on both regular and deluxe Japanese pressings, it is one of nine pre-2006 singles that do not appear on the group's greatest hits album, High Times: Singles 1992–2006. There are two different versions of the music video for the track. The first video features Jay Kay performing the song, intercut with footage of a couple kissing. The second video removes the footage of the couple kissing. The track was later released as the double A-side to "Light Years" in the United States.

According to Toby Smith's (keyboards) acknowledgments in the vinyl 2-LP reissue of The Return of the Space Cowboy, the song was inspired by a woman named Gabriella.

Critical reception
In his weekly UK chart commentary, James Masterton wrote that "for Jamiroquai, operating here it seems on autopilot with another piece of jazz/funk that is so distinctively him that he is in danger of sounding formulaic." A reviewer from The Mix noted that "the ghost of Stevie Wonder lingers particularly on "Half the Man", an appealing tune in which even J.K.'s vocal at times resembles Stevie's harmonica." Pan-European magazine Music & Media commented, "Spaced out after his first single off the new album, Jamiroquai now conjures up the rabbit out of his hat: a mildly swinging track with great radio-in-a-coffee-shop capacity." Andy Beevers from Music Week gave it four out of five, adding that "this mid-tempo track is a real grower and underlines how Jamiroquai's songwriting has matured." Pete Stanton from Smash Hits wrote, "Gentle, laid-back soul that'd be at home in Ricardo's Wine Bar."

Music video
The music video for "Half the Man" was directed by Scottish music video, commercial and feature film director Paul Boyd. It is made in black-and-white video and was first officially published on YouTube in November 2009. The video has amassed over 5 million views on YouTube alone as of January 2023.

Track listings
 UK CD single 1
 "Half the Man" (Edit) – 3:35
 "Space Clav" – 4:56 (Written by – Gary Barnacle/Toby Smith/Stuart Zender)
 "Emergency on Planet Earth" (London Rican Mix) – 7:10
 "Half the Man" (Album Version) – 4:48

 UK CD single 2
 "Half the Man" (Edit) – 3:35
 "When You Gonna Learn (Didgeridoo)" – 3:48
 "Too Young to Die" (Edit) – 3:22
 "Blow Your Mind" (Edit) – 3:51

 UK 12" vinyl
 "Half the Man" (Edit) – 3:35
 "Emergency on Planet Earth" (London Rican Mix) – 7:10
 "Space Clav" – 4:56

Charts

References

https://www.hhv.de/shop/en/item/jamiroquai-the-return-of-the-space-cowboy-558909

1994 singles
1994 songs
Black-and-white music videos
Jamiroquai songs
Music videos directed by Paul Boyd
Songs written by Jason Kay
Songs written by Toby Smith
S2 Records singles

it:Half the Man
ka:Half the Man (Jamiroquai-ს სიმღერა)